Marcello Veneziale (born 20 April 1941) was an Italian magistrate and politician who served as Mayor of Isernia (1993–1995) and President of Molise for two terms (1995–1998, 1999–2000).

References

1941 births
Living people
Mayors of Isernia
Presidents of Molise
20th-century Italian politicians